Nike is an abstract sculpture depicting Nike, the Greek goddess of victory, designed by Greek artist Pavlos Angelos Kougioumtzis. Versions of the statue have been donated to every host city of the Olympics since 1996.

Olympia, Greece

Atlanta

Beijing

Vancouver

The Vancouver statue was donated by the city of Olympia to commemorate the 2010 Winter Olympics and Paralympics. It was installed at the Cordova Street median at Thurlow in 2014, after being stored at the city works yard for four years.

London
A version of the statue was installed in the Royal Arsenal, Woolwich, London in 2012. It is made of bronze.

See also
 List of public art in Greenwich

References

1995 establishments in Greece
1996 establishments in Georgia (U.S. state)
2008 establishments in China
2012 establishments in England
2014 establishments in British Columbia
Abstract sculptures in Canada
Abstract sculptures in China
Abstract sculptures in Georgia (U.S. state)
Abstract sculptures in Greece
Abstract sculptures in the United Kingdom
Bronze sculptures in British Columbia
Bronze sculptures in China
Bronze sculptures in Georgia (U.S. state)
Bronze sculptures in Greece
Bronze sculptures in the United Kingdom
Outdoor sculptures in Georgia (U.S. state)
Outdoor sculptures in London
Outdoor sculptures in Vancouver
Sculptures in Atlanta
Sculptures of Nike
Statues in Canada
Statues in China
Statues in Greece
Statues in London
Woolwich
Coal Harbour